Tiverton Hundred was the name of one of thirty two ancient administrative units of Devon, England.

The parishes in the hundred were:
Calverleigh, Huntsham, Loxbeare, Tiverton and Uplowman (part).

See also 
 List of hundreds of England and Wales - Devon

References 

Tiverton, Devon
Hundreds of Devon